Rhabdopleura striata is a sessile hemichordate. It is a suspension feeder that secretes tubes on the ocean floor.

The zooids are dark brown.

Distribution
Rhabdopleura striata is known only from a single collection from coral reefs off the coast of northern Sri Lanka.

References

striata
Animals described in 1909
Fauna of the Indian Ocean
Invertebrates of Sri Lanka